The most popular car colours  were greyscale colours, with over 70% of cars produced globally being white, black, grey or silver. Red, blue and brown/beige cars ranged between 6% and 10% each, while all other colours amounted to less than 5%.

Survey results (2012) 
The results of colour popularity surveys conducted by American paint manufacturers PPG Industries (PPG) and DuPont (DP) (both for the year 2012) are shown in the table and chart below. Note that the results for silver and grey may be affected by discrepancies in how the companies classify these colours.

Financial impacts of colour choice 
Silver is a popular colour for rental vehicles. Cars that are silver retain their value better than any other colour, reselling for around 10% more than white cars; this superior resale value has caused many UK police agencies to replace their standard white patrol cars with silver models.

A common misconception is that red cars cost more to insure; in fact, insurers do not take colour into account.

Studies show that white cars are safer, getting in 12% fewer collisions than black cars, although some studies show yellow cars as being slightly safer than white. This is a major reason why school buses are yellow in much of the world. The safety difference is because lighter coloured cars are easier for other drivers to see, especially at night. However, other factors, such as driver behavior and weather, are significantly more important to vehicle safety.

Historical trends 

Colour choice is subject to fluctuation and fashion, and historical trends shifted from dark neutral colours of early cars, through more vivid colours of 1950s and 1960s, back towards today's greyscale colours.

Gender differences
A 2013 survey in the United States found that men were 12% more likely to prefer a red car, while women were 9% more likely to prefer silver. The research suggested this may indicate that women are more likely to prefer practical cars, while men may be more likely to prefer less practical but more fast and fun cars.

See also
 Metallic paint

References 

Automotive industry
Color